The Longest Distance is a 2013 film directed by Claudia Pinto. A Venezuelan/Spanish co-production, the film was nominated for Best Ibero-American Film at the 29th Goya Awards.

Synopsis
An old woman, Martina, has discovered she is dying, and seeks to travel from Spain to the Gran Sabana in order to die on Mount Roraima, but she knows she cannot make the journey alone. Her grandson Lucas, who just lost his mom, finds her after his mother's death and spends some time with her before Martina decides to hike the mountain.

Cast

Production 
The film was produced by Sin Rodeos Films alongside Castro PC, with the support of CNAC and the collaboration of ICAA, TV3 and Ibermedia.

Accolades 

|-
| align = "center" rowspan = "2" | 2015 || 29th Goya Awards || colspan = "2" | Best Ibero-American Film ||  || 
|-
| 2nd Platino Awards || colspan = "2" | Best Ibero-American Debut Film ||  || 
|}

References

External links
 

2013 films
2013 drama films
Spanish independent films
2010s Spanish-language films
Films about death
Films set in Venezuela
2013 independent films
Venezuelan drama films
Spanish drama films